The double copula, also known as the reduplicative copula, double is or Isis, is the usage of two successive copulae when only one is necessary, largely in spoken English. For example:

My point is, is that...

This construction is accepted by many English speakers in everyday speech, though some listeners interpret it as stumbling or hesitation, and others as a "really annoying language blunder".

Some prescriptive guides do not accept this usage, but do accept a circumstance where "is" appears twice in sequence when the subject happens to end with a copula; for example:

What my point is is that...

In the latter sentence, "What my point is" is a dependent clause, and functions as the subject; the second "is" is the main verb of the sentence. In the former sentence, "My point" is a complete subject, and requires only one "is" as the main verb of the sentence. Another example of grammatically valid use of "is is" is "All it is is a ..."

Some sources describe the usage after a dependent clause (the second example) as "non-standard" rather than generally correct.

Words other than "is"

The term double is, though commonly used to describe this practice, is somewhat inaccurate, since other forms of the word (such as "was" and "were") can be used in the same manner:
The problem being, is that...

According to the third edition of Fowler's Modern English Usage (as revised by Robert Burchfield), the double copula originated around 1971 in the United States and had spread to the United Kingdom by 1987.

Explanations

The "double is" has been explained as an intensifier or as a way to keep the rhythm of the sentence.  Some commentators recommend against using it as a matter of style (not correctness of grammar), because some people find it awkward.

See also 

 Zero copula, omission of the copula in some languages or styles
 Pro-drop languages such as Spanish, where subject pronouns are often dropped and implied in their copulas

References

External links
 Double "is" at alt-usage-.org
 The Reduplicative Copula Is Is
 StackExchange thread with statistical chart of occurrences over time
 Collection of observations

English grammar